The Swan 441 was designed by Ron Holland.

External links
 Nautor Swan

References

Sailing yachts
Keelboats
1970s sailboat type designs
Sailboat types built by Nautor Swan
Sailboat type designs by Ron Holland